Dariusz Łatka (born September 14, 1978 in Kraków) is a Polish retired football player.

Honours

Club
FK Jelgava
 Latvian Football Cup: 2014–15

External links
 
 
 
 Dariusz Łatka  at jagiellonia.neostrada.pl 

1978 births
Living people
Footballers from Kraków
Polish footballers
Wisła Kraków players
Wawel Kraków players
Hutnik Nowa Huta players
Jagiellonia Białystok players
Korona Kielce players
Podbeskidzie Bielsko-Biała players
FK Jelgava players
Bałtyk Gdynia players
Expatriate footballers in Latvia
Polish expatriate footballers
Polish expatriate sportspeople in Latvia
Association football midfielders